JoAnn Turovsky is a harp teacher in Los Angeles, California. She is an adjunct professor of harp at the Thornton School of Music at the University of Southern California, and at Colburn School of Performing Arts. She performs with the Los Angeles Opera, the Los Angeles Chamber Orchestra and has recorded for numerous motion pictures and television shows as a studio musician. She also serves on the faculty at the Music Academy of the West.

References

External links
http://www.musicacademy.org/school/faculty-guests/faculty/instrumental-programs/harp/joann-turovsky
https://www.laopera.org/about-us/artists-2/la-opera-orchestra/orchestra-musicians/joann-turovsky/

American harpists
Living people
Music Academy of the West faculty
USC Thornton School of Music faculty
Year of birth missing (living people)